Early general elections were held in Sweden 5 and 13 September 1914, the second that year. Although the General Electoral League received the most votes, the Swedish Social Democratic Party emerged as the largest party, winning 87 of the 230 seats in the Second Chamber, and have managed to remain so in every subsequent Swedish election.

Results

The General Electoral League and Farmers' League had a tactical arrangement that saw all the votes for the latter land as Electoral League in the constituencies. Therefore, the Electoral League may correctly also be attributed 268,631 votes or 36.7%.

References

1914 09
Sweden
General 2
Sweden